Johanna Larsson was the defending champion, but lost in the semifinals to Kateřina Siniaková.

Laura Siegemund won her first WTA title, defeating Siniaková in the final, 7–5, 6–1.

Seeds

Draw

Finals

Top half

Bottom half

Qualifying

Seeds

Qualifiers

Draw

First qualifier

Second qualifier

Third qualifier

Fourth qualifier

Fifth qualifier

Sixth qualifier

External Links
 Main draw
 Qualifying draw

Swedish Open - Singles
2016 Women's Singles
2016 in Swedish women's sport